Edmund Breese (June 18, 1871 – April 6, 1936) was an American stage and film actor of the silent era.

Biography
Breese was born in Brooklyn, New York. His parents were Renshaw Breese and Josephine Busby.

The Opera House in Eureka Springs, Arkansas, was the site of Breese's stage debut in the summer of 1895. He portrayed Adonis Evergreen in My Awful Dad.

Long on the stage with a varied Broadway career before entering films, Breese appeared with James O'Neill in The Count of Monte Cristo (1893), The Lion and the Mouse (1906) with Richard Bennett, The Third Degree (1909) with Helen Ware, The Master Mind (1913) with Elliott Dexter, the popular World War I era play Why Marry? (1917) with Estelle Winwood & Nat C. Goodwin and So This Is London (1922) with Donald Gallaher. He also acted in a stock company at the Castle Square Theatre in Boston.

Breese's film career began in 1914 with the Edison Studios. He appeared in more than 120 films between 1914 and 1935.He is best remembered as the advice-giving German businessman at the beginning of the war film All Quiet on the Western Front

His final role was on stage in Night of January 16th from September 1935 to April 1936. Just before the play ended its run, Breese developed peritonitis, from which he died on April 6, 1936 at the Hospital for the Ruptured and Crippled. Funeral services were at the Church of the Transfiguration in New York City on April 8, 1936, after which his body was cremated.

Breese's first wife was Genevieve Landry. At the time of his death, he was married to Harriet Beach.

Selected filmography

 The Master Mind (1914) as Richard Allen
 The Walls of Jericho (1914) as Jack Frobisher
 The Shooting of Dan McGrew (1915) as Jim Maxwell
 The Song of the Wage Slave (1915) as Ned Lane
 The Lure of Heart's Desire (1916) as Jim Carew
 The Spell of the Yukon (1916) as Jim Carson
 The Weakness of Strength (1916) as Daniel Gaynor
 Someone Must Pay (1919)
 His Temporary Wife (1920) as Judge Laton
 Chains of Evidence (1920) as Judge Frank Sturgis
 A Common Level (1920) as Matthew Ryan
 Burn 'Em Up Barnes (1921) as King Cole
 Beyond the Rainbow (1922) as Insp. Richardson
 Sure Fire Flint (1922) as Johnny Jetts
 The Curse of Drink (1922) as John Rand
 Jacqueline (1923) as Edmund MacDonald
 Luck (1923) as Alan Crosby
 The Little Red Schoolhouse (1923) as Brent
 You Are Guilty (1923) as Judge Elkins
 Bright Lights of Broadway (1923) as Reverend Graham Drake
 Marriage Morals (1923) as Harry's Father
 The Fair Cheat (1923) as Morgan Van Dam
 Three O'Clock in the Morning (1923) as Mr. Winthrop
 Restless Wives (1924) as Hobart Richards
 Damaged Hearts (1924) as Innkeeper
 The Sixth Commandment (1924) as Col. Saunders
 The Speed Spook (1924) as Chuck Brady
 Those Who Judge (1924) as Henry Dawson
 Playthings of Desire (1924) as Governor Cabbot
 The Early Bird (1925) as The Great La Tour
 Wildfire (1925) as Sen. Woodhurst
 The Police Patrol (1925) as Tony Rocco
 The Live Wire (1925) as Sawdust Sam
 Womanhandled (1925) as Uncle Lester
 The Highbinders (1926) as Mike Harrigan
 The Brown Derby (1926) as John J. Caldwell
 Stepping Along (1926) as Prince Ferdinand Darowitsky
 Paradise for Two (1927) as Uncle Howard
 Back to Liberty (1927) as Tom Devon / Reginald Briand
 Home Made (1927) as Mr. Tilford
 Finders Keepers (1928) as Col. Hastings
 Burning Daylight (1928) as John Dossett
 The Perfect Crime (1928) as Wilmot
 The Wright Idea (1928) as Mr. Filbert
 The Haunted House (1928) as Uncle Herbert
 On Trial (1928) as Judge
 Conquest (1928) as William Holden
 Fancy Baggage (1929) as John Hardin
 Sonny Boy (1929) as Thorpe
 Girls Gone Wild (1929) as Judge Elliott
 From Headquarters (1929) as Bit Part (uncredited)
 The Gamblers (1929) as Bit Part (uncredited)
 Girl Overboard (1929) as Jim Keefe
 The Hottentot (1929) as Ollie
 In the Headlines (1929) as Eddy
 Hold Everything (1930) as Pop O'Keefe
 All Quiet on the Western Front (1930) as Herr Meyer, the Stammtisch speaker
 The Czar of Broadway (1930) as McNab
 Rough Waters (1930) as Captain Thomas
 The Sea Bat (1930) as Maddocks
 Top Speed (1930) as Spencer Colgate
 Bright Lights (1930) as Harris
 Playboy of Paris (1930) as General (uncredited)
 Kismet (1930) as Jawan
 Tol'able David (1930) as Hunter Kinemon
 Playthings of Hollywood (1930) as Unknown Role
 The Painted Desert (1931) as Judge Matthews
 The Last Parade (1931) as City Editor (uncredited)
 Millie (1931) as Defense Attorney
 The She-Wolf (1931) as William Remington
 Young Sinners (1931) as Trent
 The Good Bad Girl (1931) as Mr. J.P. Henderson
 Defenders of the Law (1931) as Police Commander Randall
 The Public Defender (1931) as Frank Wells
 Wicked (1931)
 Chinatown After Dark (1931) as Le Fong
 Platinum Blonde (1931) as Conroy - the Editor
 Morals for Women (1931) as Mr. Huston
 Mata Hari (1931) as Warden
 The Hatchet Man (1932) as Yu Chang
 Cross-Examination (1932) as Dwight Simpson - Prosecuting Attorney
 The Reckoning (1932) as Doc
 Police Court (1932) as Judge Robert Webster
 Love Bound (1932) as J.B. 'Lucky' Morrison
 Young Bride (1932) as Mr. C. B. Chadwick, the Broker
 As You Desire Me (1932) as Friar (uncredited)
 Alias Mary Smith (1932) as Father
 The Hurricane Express (1932) as Frank Stratton
 Drifting Souls (1932) as Brad Martin
 The Cabin in the Cotton (1932) as Holmes Scott
 The Golden West (1932) as Sam Lynch
 Women Won't Tell (1932) as Attorney for the Defense
 Madame Butterfly (1932) as Cho-Cho's grandfather
 The Match King (1932) as Olaf Christofsen
 The Billion Dollar Scandal (1933) as Haddock
 International House (1933) as Dr. Wong
 Fighting with Kit Carson (1933, Serial) as Matt Fargo [Chs. 1–7, 12]
 Laughing at Life (1933) as Cabinet Officer
 The Stranger's Return (1933) as Dr. Craig (uncredited)
 A Man of Sentiment (1933) as John Russell Sr.
 Ladies Must Love (1933) as Thomas Van Dyne
 Only Yesterday (1933) as Wall Street Investor
 Female (1933) as Board Member (uncredited)
 Duck Soup (1933) as Former President Zander, Firefly's predecessor
 Above the Clouds (1933) as Crusty
 On Your Guard (1933) as Prison Warden
 Beloved (1934) as Maj. Tarrant
 Dancing Man (1934) as J.C. Trevor
 Come On, Marines! (1934) as Gen. Cabot
 Return of the Terror (1934) as Editor
 Treasure Island (1934) as Pirate of the Spanish Main
 The Law of the Wild (1934, Serial) as Dr. R.N. Price [Chs. 6, 11-12] (uncredited)
 Lost in the Stratosphere (1934) as Col. Brooks
 Broadway Bill (1934) as Presiding Judge
 The Marriage Bargain (1935) as Judge Robert Stanhope

References

External links

 

1871 births
1936 deaths
19th-century American male actors
American male stage actors
20th-century American male actors
Male actors from New York City
American male film actors
American male silent film actors
People from Brooklyn
Burials at Forest Lawn Memorial Park (Glendale)
Deaths from peritonitis